Aamse is a small village in Ridala Parish, Lääne County, in western Estonia. It is located to the east of Haapsalu, between the villages of Tammiku and Taebla.

References

Villages in Lääne County